Becky Drury is a communications specialist and marketing coordinator with Golden West Communications and a Republican member of the South Dakota House of Representatives since January 12, 2021.

Election history
In 2020, Drury was elected with 5,587 votes along with Rep. Chris P. Johnson who received 6,391 votes and they defeated James Preston who received 3,932 votes and Toni Diamond who received 3,826 votes.

References

Living people
Year of birth missing (living people)
Women state legislators in South Dakota
Republican Party members of the South Dakota House of Representatives
Politicians from Rapid City, South Dakota
21st-century American women